Resonance is an album by the Madras String Quartet led by violinist V.S. Narasimhan. The album consists of several compositions in Carnatic Music that are played against a background of harmonies from Western Classical Music. This album is the result of an effort to fuse Western Classical Music and Indian Classical Music. The songs are played entirely on a violin with cellos and violas providing the background.

Some Carnatic Musicians have criticized the Quartet saying that they are "Innovative but Discordant". The album, however has received significant praise from many music enthusiasts all over India.

The album comprises nine songs:

References

External links
 Resonance
 Madras String Quartet Homepage
 Madras String Quartet mentioned in The Hindu
 Madras String Quartet Releases new album mentioned in The Hindu
 The Madras String Quartet plays Cerebral music from BangaloreMirror.com

2000 albums